Hoseynabad-e Jadid (also Romanized as Hoseynābād-e Jadīd; also known as Ḩoseynābād, Ḩoseynābād-e Novī, and Husainābād) is a village in Hoseynabad Rural District, Esmaili District, Anbarabad County, Kerman Province, Iran. At the 2006 census, its population was 618, in 138 families.

References 

Populated places in Anbarabad County